Ed Coleman may refer to:

Ed Coleman (baseball) (1901–1964), MLB player from 1932 to 1936
Ed Coleman (sportscaster) (born 1949), radio host for the New York Mets on WFAN

See also
Edward Coleman (disambiguation)